Nomination Whist may refer to:

 Nomination Whist (Oh Hell variant), one of several names for the international card game, Oh Hell
 Nomination Whist, another name for the British card game of Clag
 Nomination Whist, another name for the British card game of Noms, Nommie or Small Ships Rules